The coat of arms of Alabama depicts a shield upon which is carried the symbols of the five states which have at various times held sovereignty over a part or the whole of what is now Alabama. These are the ancient coat of arms of France (three fleurs-de-lis), the ancient coat of arms of Crown of Castile for Spain (Castile quartering León), the modern Union Jack of the United Kingdom (anachronistically, since a different version of the British flag would have been flown in British West Florida and the Province of Georgia long before the Alabama Territory was established) and the battle flag of the Confederate States of America. On an escutcheon of pretence is borne the shield of the United States. The crest of the coat represents a ship (the "Badine") which brought the French colonists who established the first permanent European settlements in the territory. Below is the state motto: Audemus jura nostra defendere, meaning "We dare defend our rights."

The bill to adopt a state coat of arms was introduced in the Alabama Legislature of 1939 by James Simpson, Jefferson County, and was passed without a dissenting vote by both houses. 

The original design of the Alabamian coat of arms was made in 1923 by B.J. Tieman, New York, an authority on heraldry, at the request of Marie Bankhead Owen, Director of the Department of Archives and History.  A few years later Naomi Rabb Winston, Washington, DC, painted the completed design in oil.  Mrs. Owen selected the motto which was put into Latin by Professor W.B. Saffold, of the University of Alabama.  It was through the influence of Juliet Perry Dixon, wife of Governor Dixon, that official action was taken by the Legislature.

The Union Flag depicted on the coat of arms, which is meant to represent the period of British rule in Alabama prior to the 1783 Treaty of Paris, is not actually the flag used at that time. It dates to the 1801 formation of the United Kingdom of Great Britain and Ireland, whereas the preceding Kingdom of Great Britain held sovereignty over Alabama prior to 1783.



Official description
The official description, in heraldic language, is laid out in the Code of Alabama, Section 1-2-2:

Use
Besides being used by itself, the coat of arms is used on many governmental seals of the state, as well as the flag of the governor of Alabama.

Controversy
The presence of the Confederate battle flag on the coat of arms has generated debate. Some view it as a symbol of racism and oppression, while others see it as a meaningful part of Alabama's history. Regardless, the historical accuracy of using a battle flag as opposed to the standard Confederate flag, along with the presence of the Union Jack, which Steve Murray, the director of the Alabama Department of Archives and History, claims never flew over the state, is also disputable.

See also
Great Seal of Alabama
Coats of arms of the U.S. states
Confederate battle flag on state seals

References

Symbols of Alabama
Alabama
Alabama
Alabama
Alabama
Alabama
Alabama
Alabama
Symbols introduced in 1939